Ohhira-ike Dam  is an earthfill dam located in Mie Prefecture in Japan. The dam is used for irrigation. The dam impounds about 2  ha of land when full and can store 140 thousand cubic meters of water. The construction of the dam was started on 1973 and completed in 1979.

See also
List of dams in Japan

References

Dams in Mie Prefecture